is The Brilliant Green's fifth single, released in 1999. It peaked at #1 on the Oricon singles chart, and was the band's third #1 single.

It was the opening theme song for Fuji Television's drama Over Time.

Track listing

Other Versions
 An acoustic English version of Sono Speed de appeared on the Like Yesterday single with the title "At Light Speed".

References

1999 singles
The Brilliant Green songs
Oricon Weekly number-one singles
Songs written by Tomoko Kawase
Songs written by Shunsaku Okuda
Japanese television drama theme songs
1999 songs
Sony Music Entertainment Japan singles